Joseph Conrad (born Józef Teodor Konrad Korzeniowski, ; 3 December 1857 – 3 August 1924) was a Polish-British novelist and short story writer. He is regarded as one of the greatest writers in the English language; though he did not speak English fluently until his twenties, he came to be regarded a master prose stylist who brought a non-English sensibility into English literature. He wrote novels and stories, many in nautical settings, that depict crises of human individuality in the midst of what he saw as an indifferent, inscrutable and amoral world.

Conrad is considered a literary impressionist by some and an early modernist by others, though his works also contain elements of 19th-century realism. His narrative style and anti-heroic characters, as in Lord Jim, for example, have influenced numerous authors. Many dramatic films have been adapted from and inspired by his works. Numerous writers and critics have commented that his fictional works, written largely in the first two decades of the 20th century, seem to have anticipated later world events.

Writing near the peak of the British Empire, Conrad drew on the national experiences of his native Poland—during nearly all his life, parceled out among three occupying empires—and on his own experiences in the French and British merchant navies, to create short stories and novels that reflect aspects of a European-dominated world—including imperialism and colonialism—and that profoundly explore the human psyche. Postcolonial analysis of Conrad's work has stimulated substantial debate; in 1975, author Chinua Achebe published an article denouncing Heart of Darkness as racist and dehumanising, whereas other scholars, including Adam Hochschild and Peter Edgerly Firchow, have rebutted Achebe's view.

Life

Early years

Conrad was born on 3 December 1857 in Berdychiv, Ukraine, then part of the Russian Empire; the region had once been part of the Crown of the Kingdom of Poland. He was the only child of Apollo Korzeniowski—a writer, translator, political activist, and would-be revolutionary—and his wife Ewa Bobrowska. He was christened Józef Teodor Konrad Korzeniowski after his maternal grandfather Józef, his paternal grandfather Teodor, and the heroes (both named "Konrad") of two poems by Adam Mickiewicz, Dziady and Konrad Wallenrod. His family called him "Konrad", rather than "Józef".

Though the vast majority of the surrounding area's inhabitants were Ukrainians, and the great majority of Berdychiv's residents were Jewish, almost all the countryside was owned by the Polish szlachta (nobility), to which Conrad's family belonged as bearers of the Nałęcz coat-of-arms. Polish literature, particularly patriotic literature, was held in high esteem by the area's Polish population.

Poland had been divided among Prussia, Austria and Russia in 1795. The Korzeniowski family had played a significant role in Polish attempts to regain independence. Conrad's paternal grandfather Teodor had served under Prince Józef Poniatowski during Napoleon's Russian campaign and had formed his own cavalry squadron during the November 1830 Uprising of Poland-Lithuania against the Russian Empire. Conrad's fiercely patriotic father Apollo belonged to the "Red" political faction, whose goal was to re-establish the pre-partition boundaries of Poland and which also advocated land reform and the abolition of serfdom. Conrad's subsequent refusal to follow in Apollo's footsteps, and his choice of exile over resistance, were a source of lifelong guilt for Conrad.

Because of the father's attempts at farming and his political activism, the family moved repeatedly. In May 1861 they moved to Warsaw, where Apollo joined the resistance against the Russian Empire. He was arrested and imprisoned in Pavilion X of the Warsaw Citadel. Conrad would write: "[I]n the courtyard of this Citadel—characteristically for our nation—my childhood memories begin." In January 1863 Apollo's sentence was commuted, and the family was sent to Chernihiv in northeast Ukraine, where conditions were much better. However, on 18 April 1865 Ewa died of tuberculosis.

Apollo did his best to teach Conrad at home. The boy's early reading introduced him to the two elements that later dominated his life: in Victor Hugo's Toilers of the Sea, he encountered the sphere of activity to which he would devote his youth; Shakespeare brought him into the orbit of English literature. Most of all, though, he read Polish Romantic poetry. Half a century later he explained that 
"The Polishness in my works comes from Mickiewicz and Słowacki. My father read [Mickiewicz's] Pan Tadeusz aloud to me and made me read it aloud.... I used to prefer [Mickiewicz's] Konrad Wallenrod [and] Grażyna. Later I preferred Słowacki. You know why Słowacki?... [He is the soul of all Poland]".

In December 1867, Apollo took his son to the Austrian-held part of Poland, which for two years had been enjoying considerable internal freedom and a degree of self-government. After sojourns in Lwów and several smaller localities, on 20 February 1869 they moved to Kraków (until 1596 the capital of Poland), likewise in Austrian Poland. A few months later, on 23 May 1869, Apollo Korzeniowski died, leaving Conrad orphaned at the age of eleven. Like Conrad's mother, Apollo had been gravely ill with tuberculosis. 

The young Conrad was placed in the care of Ewa's brother, Tadeusz Bobrowski. Conrad's poor health and his unsatisfactory schoolwork caused his uncle constant problems and no end of financial outlay. Conrad was not a good student; despite tutoring, he excelled only in geography. At that time he likely received private tutoring only, as there is no evidence he attended any school regularly. Since the boy's illness was clearly of nervous origin, the physicians supposed that fresh air and physical work would harden him; his uncle hoped that well-defined duties and the rigors of work would teach him discipline. Since he showed little inclination to study, it was essential that he learn a trade; his uncle thought he could work as a sailor-cum-businessman, who would combine maritime skills with commercial activities. In the autumn of 1871, thirteen-year-old Conrad announced his intention to become a sailor. Conrad also recalled having read books by the American James Fenimore Cooper and the English Captain Frederick Marryat. A playmate of his adolescence recalled that Conrad spun fantastic yarns, always set at sea, presented so realistically that listeners thought the action was happening before their eyes.

In August 1873 Bobrowski sent fifteen-year-old Conrad to Lwów to a cousin who ran a small boarding house for boys orphaned by the 1863 Uprising; group conversation there was in French. The owner's daughter recalled:

Conrad had been at the establishment for just over a year when in September 1874, for uncertain reasons, his uncle removed him from school in Lwów and took him back to Kraków.

On 13 October 1874 Bobrowski sent the sixteen-year-old to Marseilles, France, for Conrad's planned merchant-marine career on French merchant ships. His uncle provided him with a monthly stipend as well (set at 150 francs). Though Conrad had not completed secondary school, his accomplishments included fluency in French (with a correct accent), some knowledge of Latin, German and Greek; probably a good knowledge of history, some geography, and probably already an interest in physics. He was well read, particularly in Polish Romantic literature. He belonged to the second generation in his family that had had to earn a living outside the family estates. They were born and reared partly in the milieu of the working intelligentsia, a social class that was starting to play an important role in Central and Eastern Europe. He had absorbed enough of the history, culture and literature of his native land to be able eventually to develop a distinctive world view and make unique contributions to the literature of his adoptive Britain.

Tensions that originated in his childhood in Poland and increased in his adulthood abroad contributed to Conrad's greatest literary achievements. Zdzisław Najder, himself an emigrant from Poland, observes:

Some critics have suggested that when Conrad left Poland, he wanted to break once and for all with his Polish past. In refutation of this, Najder quotes from Conrad's 14 August 1883 letter to family friend Stefan Buszczyński, written nine years after Conrad had left Poland:

Merchant marine

In Marseilles Conrad had an intense social life, often stretching his budget. A trace of these years can be found in the northern Corsica town of Luri, where there is a plaque to a Corsican merchant seaman, Dominique Cervoni, whom Conrad befriended.  Cervoni became the inspiration for some of Conrad's characters, such as the title character of the 1904 novel Nostromo.  Conrad visited Corsica with his wife in 1921, partly in search of connections with his long-dead friend and fellow merchant seaman.
 
In late 1877 Conrad's maritime career was interrupted by the refusal of the Russian consul to provide documents needed for him to continue his service. As a result, Conrad fell into debt, and in March 1878 he attempted suicide. He survived, and received further financial aid from his uncle, allowing him to resume his normal life. After nearly four years in France and on French ships, Conrad joined the British merchant marine, enlisting in April 1878 (he had most likely started learning English shortly before).

For the next fifteen years, he served under the Red Ensign. He worked on a variety of ships as crew member (steward, apprentice, able seaman) and then as third, second and first mate, until eventually achieving captain's rank.  During the 19 years from the time that Conrad had left Kraków in October 1874 until he signed off the Adowa in January 1894, he had worked in ships, including long periods in port, for 10 years and almost 8 months.  He had spent just over 8 years at sea—9 months of it as a passenger. His sole captaincy took place in 1888–89, when he commanded the barque Otago from Sydney to Mauritius.

During a brief call in India in 1885–86, 28-year-old Conrad sent five letters to Joseph Spiridion, a Pole eight years his senior whom he had befriended at Cardiff in June 1885 just before sailing for Singapore in the clipper ship Tilkhurst. These letters are Conrad's first preserved texts in English. His English is generally correct but stiff to the point of artificiality; many fragments suggest that his thoughts ran along the lines of Polish syntax and phraseology.

More importantly, the letters show a marked change in views from those implied in his earlier correspondence of 1881–83. He had abandoned "hope for the future" and  the conceit of "sailing [ever] toward Poland", and his Panslavic ideas. He was left with a painful sense of the hopelessness of the Polish question and an acceptance of England as a possible refuge. While he often adjusted his statements to accord to some extent with the views of his addressees, the theme of hopelessness concerning the prospects for Polish independence often occurs authentically in his correspondence and works before 1914.

 
The year 1890 marked Conrad's first return to Poland, where he would visit his uncle and other relatives and acquaintances. His visit took place while he was waiting to proceed to the Congo Free State, having been hired by Albert Thys, deputy director of the Société Anonyme Belge pour le Commerce du Haut-Congo.  Conrad's association with the Belgian company, on the Congo River, would inspire his novella, Heart of Darkness. During this period, in 1890 in the Congo, Conrad befriended Roger Casement, who was also working for Thys operating a trading and transport station in Matadi. In 1903 as British Consul in Boma he was commissioned to investigate abuses in the Congo, and later in Amazonian Peru, being knighted in 1911 for his advocacy of human rights. Casement later became active in Irish Republicanism after leaving the British consular service.  

Conrad left Africa at the end of December 1890, arriving in Brussels by late January next year. He  rejoined the British marine, as first mate, in November. When he left London on 25 October 1892 aboard the passenger clipper ship Torrens, one of the passengers was William Henry Jacques, a consumptive Cambridge University graduate who died less than a year later (19 September 1893). According to Conrad's A Personal Record, Jacques was the first reader of the still-unfinished manuscript of Conrad's Almayer's Folly.  Jacques encouraged Conrad to continue writing the novel.

Conrad completed his last long-distance voyage as a seaman on 26 July 1893 when the Torrens docked at London and "J. Conrad Korzemowin" (per the certificate of discharge) debarked. When the Torrens had left Adelaide on 13 March 1893, the passengers had included two young Englishmen returning from Australia and New Zealand: 25-year-old lawyer and future novelist John Galsworthy; and Edward Lancelot Sanderson, who was going to help his father run a boys' preparatory school at Elstree. They were probably the first Englishmen and non-sailors with whom Conrad struck up a friendship; he would remain in touch with both. The protagonist of one of Galsworthy's first literary attempts, "The Doldrums" (1895–96), the first mate Armand, is obviously modelled on Conrad. At Cape Town, where the Torrens remained from 17 to 19 May, Galsworthy left the ship to look at the local mines. Sanderson continued his voyage and seems to have been the first to develop closer ties with Conrad. Later that year, Conrad would visit his relatives in Poland and Ukraine once again.

Writer

In the autumn of 1889, Conrad began writing his first novel, Almayer's Folly.

Conrad's later letters to literary friends show the attention that he devoted to analysis of style, to individual words and expressions, to the emotional tone of phrases, to the atmosphere created by language.  In this, Conrad in his own way followed the example of Gustave Flaubert, notorious for searching days on end for le mot juste—for the right word to render the "essence of the matter." Najder opines:  "[W]riting in a foreign language admits a greater temerity in tackling personally sensitive problems, for it leaves uncommitted the most spontaneous, deeper reaches of the psyche, and allows a greater distance in treating matters we would hardly dare approach in the language of our childhood.  As a rule it is easier both to swear and to analyze dispassionately in an acquired language."

In 1894, aged 36, Conrad reluctantly gave up the sea, partly because of poor health, partly due to unavailability of ships, and partly because he had become so fascinated with writing that he had decided on a literary career. Almayer's Folly, set on the east coast of Borneo, was published in 1895. Its appearance marked his first use of the pen name "Joseph Conrad"; "Konrad" was, of course, the third of his Polish given names, but his use of it—in the anglicised version, "Conrad"—may also have been an homage to the Polish Romantic poet Adam Mickiewicz's patriotic narrative poem, Konrad Wallenrod.

Edward Garnett, a young publisher's reader and literary critic who would play one of the chief supporting roles in Conrad's literary career, had—like Unwin's first reader of Almayer's Folly, Wilfrid Hugh Chesson—been impressed by the manuscript, but Garnett had been "uncertain whether the English was good enough for publication." Garnett had shown the novel to his wife, Constance Garnett, later a translator of Russian literature. She had thought Conrad's foreignness a positive merit.

While Conrad had only limited personal acquaintance with the peoples of Maritime Southeast Asia, the region looms large in his early work. According to Najder, Conrad, the exile and wanderer, was aware of a difficulty that he confessed more than once: the lack of a common cultural background with his Anglophone readers meant he could not compete with English-language authors writing about the English-speaking world. At the same time, the choice of a non-English colonial setting freed him from an embarrassing division of loyalty: Almayer's Folly, and later "An Outpost of Progress" (1897, set in a Congo exploited by King Leopold II of Belgium) and Heart of Darkness (1899, likewise set in the Congo), contain bitter reflections on colonialism. The Malay states came theoretically under the suzerainty of the Dutch government; Conrad did not write about the area's British dependencies, which he never visited. He "was apparently intrigued by... struggles aimed at preserving national independence. The prolific and destructive richness of tropical nature and the dreariness of human life within it accorded well with the pessimistic mood of his early works."

Almayer's Folly, together with its successor, An Outcast of the Islands (1896), laid the foundation for Conrad's reputation as a romantic teller of exotic tales—a misunderstanding of his purpose that was to frustrate him for the rest of his career.

Almost all of Conrad's writings were first published in newspapers and magazines: influential reviews like The Fortnightly Review and the North American Review; avant-garde publications like the Savoy, New Review, and The English Review; popular short-fiction magazines like The Saturday Evening Post and Harper's Magazine; women's journals like the Pictorial Review and Romance; mass-circulation dailies like the Daily Mail and the New York Herald; and illustrated newspapers like The Illustrated London News and the Illustrated Buffalo Express. He also wrote for The Outlook, an imperialist weekly magazine, between 1898 and 1906.

Financial success long eluded Conrad, who often requested advances from magazine and book publishers, and loans from acquaintances such as John Galsworthy. Eventually a government grant ("civil list pension") of £100 per annum, awarded on 9 August 1910, somewhat relieved his financial worries, and in time collectors began purchasing his manuscripts. Though his talent was early on recognised by English intellectuals, popular success eluded him until the 1913 publication of Chance, which is often considered one of his weaker novels.

Personal life

Temperament and health
Conrad was a reserved man, wary of showing emotion. He scorned sentimentality; his manner of portraying emotion in his books was full of restraint, scepticism and irony. In the words of his uncle Bobrowski, as a young man Conrad was "extremely sensitive, conceited, reserved, and in addition excitable. In short [...] all the defects of the Nałęcz family."

Conrad suffered throughout life from ill health, physical and mental. A newspaper review of a Conrad biography suggested that the book could have been subtitled Thirty Years of Debt, Gout, Depression and Angst. In 1891 he was hospitalised for several months, suffering from gout, neuralgic pains in his right arm and recurrent attacks of malaria. He also complained of swollen hands "which made writing difficult". Taking his uncle Tadeusz Bobrowski's advice, he convalesced at a spa in Switzerland. Conrad had a phobia of dentistry, neglecting his teeth until they had to be extracted. In one letter he remarked that every novel he had written had cost him a tooth. Conrad's physical afflictions were, if anything, less vexatious than his mental ones. In his letters he often described symptoms of depression; "the evidence", writes Najder, "is so strong that it is nearly impossible to doubt it."

Attempted suicide
In March 1878, at the end of his Marseilles period, 20-year-old Conrad attempted suicide, by shooting himself in the chest with a revolver. According to his uncle, who was summoned by a friend, Conrad had fallen into debt. Bobrowski described his subsequent "study" of his nephew in an extensive letter to Stefan Buszczyński, his own ideological opponent and a friend of Conrad's late father Apollo. To what extent the suicide attempt had been made in earnest likely will never be known, but it is suggestive of a situational depression.

Romance and marriage
In 1888 during a stop-over on Mauritius, in the Indian Ocean, Conrad developed a couple of romantic interests.  One of these would be described in his 1910 story "A Smile of Fortune", which contains autobiographical elements (e.g., one of the characters is the same Chief Mate Burns who appears in The Shadow Line). The narrator, a young captain, flirts ambiguously and surreptitiously with Alice Jacobus, daughter of a local merchant living in a house surrounded by a magnificent rose garden. Research has confirmed that in Port Louis at the time there was a 17-year-old Alice Shaw, whose father, a shipping agent, owned the only rose garden in town.

More is known about Conrad's other, more open flirtation. An old friend, Captain Gabriel Renouf of the French merchant marine, introduced him to the family of his brother-in-law. Renouf's eldest sister was the wife of Louis Edward Schmidt, a senior official in the colony; with them lived two other sisters and two brothers. Though the island had been taken over in 1810 by Britain, many of the inhabitants were descendants of the original French colonists, and Conrad's excellent French and perfect manners opened all local salons to him. He became a frequent guest at the Schmidts', where he often met the Misses Renouf. A couple of days before leaving Port Louis, Conrad asked one of the Renouf brothers for the hand of his 26-year-old sister Eugenie. She was already, however, engaged to marry her pharmacist cousin. After the rebuff, Conrad did not pay a farewell visit but sent a polite letter to Gabriel Renouf, saying he would never return to Mauritius and adding that on the day of the wedding his thoughts would be with them.

On 24 March 1896 Conrad married an Englishwoman, Jessie George. The couple had two sons, Borys and John. The elder, Borys, proved a disappointment in scholarship and integrity. Jessie was an unsophisticated, working-class girl, sixteen years younger than Conrad. To his friends, she was an inexplicable choice of wife, and the subject of some rather disparaging and unkind remarks. (See Lady Ottoline Morrell's opinion of Jessie in Impressions.) However, according to other biographers such as Frederick Karl, Jessie provided what Conrad needed, namely a "straightforward, devoted, quite competent" companion. Similarly, Jones remarks that, despite whatever difficulties the marriage endured, "there can be no doubt that the relationship sustained Conrad's career as a writer", which might have been much less successful without her.

The couple rented a long series of successive homes, mostly in the English countryside. Conrad, who suffered frequent depressions, made great efforts to change his mood; the most important step was to move into another house. His frequent changes of home were usually signs of a search for psychological regeneration. Between 1910 and 1919 Conrad's home was Capel House in Orlestone, Kent, which was rented to him by Lord and Lady Oliver. It was here that he wrote The Rescue, Victory, and The Arrow of Gold.

Except for several vacations in France and Italy, a 1914 vacation in his native Poland, and a 1923 visit to the United States, Conrad lived the rest of his life in England.

Sojourn in Poland

The 1914 vacation with his wife and sons in Poland, at the urging of Józef Retinger, coincided with the outbreak of World War I. On 28 July 1914, the day war broke out between Austro-Hungary and Serbia, Conrad and the Retingers arrived in Kraków (then in the Austro-Hungarian Empire), where Conrad visited childhood haunts. As the city lay only a few miles from the Russian border, there was a risk of being stranded in a battle zone. With wife Jessie and younger son John ill, Conrad decided to take refuge in the mountain resort town of Zakopane. They left Kraków on 2 August. A few days after arrival in Zakopane, they moved to the Konstantynówka pension operated by Conrad's cousin Aniela Zagórska; it had been frequented by celebrities including the statesman Józef Piłsudski and Conrad's acquaintance, the young concert pianist Artur Rubinstein.

Zagórska introduced Conrad to Polish writers, intellectuals, and artists who had also taken refuge in Zakopane, including novelist Stefan Żeromski and Tadeusz Nalepiński, a writer friend of anthropologist Bronisław Malinowski. Conrad aroused interest among the Poles as a famous writer and an exotic compatriot from abroad. He charmed new acquaintances, especially women. However, Marie Curie's physician sister, Bronisława Dłuska, wife of fellow physician and eminent socialist activist Kazimierz Dłuski, openly berated Conrad for having used his great talent for purposes other than bettering the future of his native land. 

But thirty-two-year-old Aniela Zagórska (daughter of the pension keeper), Conrad's niece who would translate his works into Polish in 1923–39, idolised him, kept him company, and provided him with books. He particularly delighted in the stories and novels of the ten-years-older, recently deceased Bolesław Prus, who also had visited Zakopane, read everything by his fellow victim of Poland's 1863 Uprising—"my beloved Prus"—that he could get his hands on, and pronounced him "better than Dickens"—a favourite English novelist of Conrad's.

Conrad, who was noted by his Polish acquaintances to still be fluent in his native tongue, participated in their impassioned political discussions. He declared presciently, as Józef Piłsudski had earlier in 1914 in Paris, that in the war, for Poland to regain independence, Russia must be beaten by the Central Powers (the Austro-Hungarian and German Empires), and the Central Powers must in turn be beaten by France and Britain.

After many travails and vicissitudes, at the beginning of November 1914 Conrad managed to bring his family back to England. On his return, he was determined to work on swaying British opinion in favour of restoring Poland's sovereignty.

Jessie Conrad would later write in her memoirs: "I understood my husband so much better after those months in Poland. So many characteristics that had been strange and unfathomable to me before, took, as it were, their right proportions. I understood that his temperament was that of his countrymen."

Politics
Biographer Zdzisław Najder wrote: 

The most extensive and ambitious political statement that Conrad ever made was his 1905 essay, "Autocracy and War", whose starting point was the Russo-Japanese War (he finished the article a month before the Battle of Tsushima Strait). The essay begins with a statement about Russia's incurable weakness and ends with warnings against Prussia, the dangerous aggressor in a future European war. For Russia he predicted a violent outburst in the near future, but Russia's lack of democratic traditions and the backwardness of her masses made it impossible for the revolution to have a salutary effect. Conrad regarded the formation of a representative government in Russia as unfeasible and foresaw a transition from autocracy to dictatorship. He saw western Europe as torn by antagonisms engendered by economic rivalry and commercial selfishness. In vain might a Russian revolution seek advice or help from a materialistic and egoistic western Europe that armed itself in preparation for wars far more brutal than those of the past.

Conrad's distrust of democracy sprang from his doubts whether the propagation of democracy as an aim in itself could solve any problems. He thought that, in view of the weakness of human nature and of the "criminal" character of society, democracy offered boundless opportunities for demagogues and charlatans.  Conrad kept his distance from partisan politics, and never voted in British national elections.

He accused social democrats of his time of acting to weaken "the national sentiment, the preservation of which [was his] concern"—of attempting to dissolve national identities in an impersonal melting-pot.  "I look at the future from the depth of a very black past and I find that nothing is left for me except fidelity to a cause lost, to an idea without future."  It was Conrad's hopeless fidelity to the memory of Poland that prevented him from believing in the idea of "international fraternity", which he considered, under the circumstances, just a verbal exercise. He resented some socialists' talk of freedom and world brotherhood while keeping silent about his own partitioned and oppressed Poland.

Before that, in the early 1880s, letters to Conrad from his uncle Tadeusz show Conrad apparently having hoped for an improvement in Poland's situation not through a liberation movement but by establishing an alliance with neighbouring Slavic nations. This had been accompanied by a faith in the Panslavic ideology—"surprising", Najder writes, "in a man who was later to emphasize his hostility towards Russia, a conviction that... Poland's [superior] civilization and... historic... traditions would [let] her play a leading role... in the Panslavic community, [and his] doubts about Poland's chances of becoming a fully sovereign nation-state."

Conrad's alienation from partisan politics went together with an abiding sense of the thinking man's burden imposed by his personality, as described in an 1894 letter by Conrad to a relative-by-marriage and fellow author, Marguerite Poradowska (née Gachet, and cousin of Vincent van Gogh's physician, Paul Gachet) of Brussels:

Conrad wrote H.G. Wells that the latter's 1901 book, Anticipations, an ambitious attempt to predict major social trends, "seems to presuppose... a sort of select circle to which you address yourself, leaving the rest of the world outside the pale. [In addition,] you do not take sufficient account of human imbecility which is cunning and perfidious."

In a 23 October 1922 letter to mathematician-philosopher Bertrand Russell, in response to the latter's book, The Problem of China, which advocated socialist reforms and an oligarchy of sages who would reshape Chinese society, Conrad explained his own distrust of political panaceas:

Leo Robson writes:

But, writes Robson, Conrad is no moral nihilist:

In an August 1901 letter to the editor of The New York Times Saturday Book Review, Conrad wrote:  "Egoism, which is the moving force of the world, and altruism, which is its morality, these two contradictory instincts, of which one is so plain and the other so mysterious, cannot serve us unless in the incomprehensible alliance of their irreconcilable antagonism."

Death

On 3 August 1924, Conrad died at his house, Oswalds, in Bishopsbourne, Kent, England, probably of a heart attack. He was interred at Canterbury Cemetery, Canterbury, under a misspelled version of his original Polish name, as "Joseph Teador Conrad Korzeniowski".  Inscribed on his gravestone are the lines from Edmund Spenser's The Faerie Queene which he had chosen as the epigraph to his last complete novel, The Rover:

Conrad's modest funeral took place amid great crowds. His old friend Edward Garnett recalled bitterly:

Another old friend of Conrad's, Cunninghame Graham, wrote Garnett:  "Aubry was saying to me... that had Anatole France died, all Paris would have been at his funeral."

Conrad's wife Jessie died twelve years later, on 6 December 1936, and was interred with him.

In 1996 his grave was designated a Grade II listed structure.

Writing style

Themes and style

Despite the opinions even of some who knew Conrad personally, such as fellow-novelist Henry James, Conrad—even when only writing elegantly crafted letters to his uncle and acquaintances—was always at heart a writer who sailed, rather than a sailor who wrote. He used his sailing experiences as a backdrop for many of his works, but he also produced works of similar world view, without the nautical motifs. The failure of many critics to appreciate this caused him much frustration.

He wrote oftener about life at sea and in exotic parts than about life on British land because—unlike, for example, his friend John Galsworthy, author of The Forsyte Saga—he knew little about everyday domestic relations in Britain.  When Conrad's The Mirror of the Sea was published in 1906 to critical acclaim, he wrote to his French translator:  "The critics have been vigorously swinging the censer to me.... Behind the concert of flattery, I can hear something like a whisper:  'Keep to the open sea!  Don't land!'  They want to banish me to the middle of the ocean."  Writing to his friend Richard Curle, Conrad remarked that "the public mind fastens on externals" such as his "sea life", oblivious to how authors transform their material "from particular to general, and appeal to universal emotions by the temperamental handling of personal experience".

Nevertheless, Conrad found much sympathetic readership, especially in the United States. H.L. Mencken was one of the earliest and most influential American readers to recognise how Conrad conjured up "the general out of the particular". F. Scott Fitzgerald, writing to Mencken, complained about having been omitted from a list of Conrad imitators. Since Fitzgerald, dozens of other American writers have acknowledged their debts to Conrad, including William Faulkner, William Burroughs, Saul Bellow, Philip Roth, Joan Didion, and Thomas Pynchon.

An October 1923 visitor to Oswalds, Conrad's home at the time—Cyril Clemens, a cousin of Mark Twain—quoted Conrad as saying: "In everything I have written there is always one invariable intention, and that is to capture the reader's attention."

Conrad the artist famously aspired, in the words of his preface to The Nigger of the 'Narcissus' (1897), "by the power of the written word to make you hear, to make you feel... before all, to make you see. That—and no more, and it is everything. If I succeed, you shall find there according to your deserts: encouragement, consolation, fear, charm—all you demand—and, perhaps, also that glimpse of truth for which you have forgotten to ask."

Writing in what to the visual arts was the age of Impressionism, and what to music was the age of impressionist music, Conrad showed himself in many of his works a prose poet of the highest order: for instance, in the evocative Patna and courtroom scenes of Lord Jim; in the scenes of the "melancholy-mad elephant" and the "French gunboat firing into a continent", in Heart of Darkness; in the doubled protagonists of The Secret Sharer; and in the verbal and conceptual resonances of Nostromo and The Nigger of the 'Narcissus'.

Conrad used his own memories as literary material so often that readers are tempted to treat his life and work as a single whole. His "view of the world", or elements of it, is often described by citing at once both his private and public statements, passages from his letters, and citations from his books. Najder warns that this approach produces an incoherent and misleading picture. "An... uncritical linking of the two spheres, literature and private life, distorts each. Conrad used his own experiences as raw material, but the finished product should not be confused with the experiences themselves."

Many of Conrad's characters were inspired by actual persons he had met, including, in his first novel, Almayer's Folly (completed 1894), William Charles Olmeijer, the spelling of whose surname Conrad probably altered to "Almayer" inadvertently. The historic trader Olmeijer, whom Conrad encountered on his four short visits to Berau in Borneo, subsequently haunted Conrad's imagination. Conrad often borrowed the authentic names of actual individuals, e.g., Captain McWhirr (Typhoon), Captain Beard and Mr. Mahon ("Youth"), Captain Lingard (Almayer's Folly and elsewhere), and Captain Ellis (The Shadow Line). "Conrad", writes J. I. M. Stewart, "appears to have attached some mysterious significance to such links with actuality." Equally curious is "a great deal of namelessness in Conrad, requiring some minor virtuosity to maintain." Thus we never learn the surname of the protagonist of Lord Jim. Conrad also preserves, in The Nigger of the 'Narcissus', the authentic name of the ship, the Narcissus, in which he sailed in 1884.

Apart from Conrad's own experiences, a number of episodes in his fiction were suggested by past or contemporary publicly known events or literary works. The 1901 short story "Amy Foster" was inspired partly by an anecdote in Ford Madox Ford's The Cinque Ports (1900), wherein a shipwrecked sailor from a German merchant ship, unable to communicate in English, and driven away by the local country people, finally found shelter in a pigsty.

In Nostromo (completed 1904), the theft of a massive consignment of silver was suggested to Conrad by a story he had heard in the Gulf of Mexico and later read about in a "volume picked up outside a second-hand bookshop."  The novel's political strand, according to Maya Jasanoff, is related to the creation of the Panama Canal. "In January 1903", she writes, "just as Conrad started writing Nostromo, the US and Colombian secretaries of state signed a treaty granting the United States a one-hundred-year renewable lease on a six-mile strip flanking the canal...  While the [news]papers murmured about revolution in Colombia, Conrad opened a fresh section of Nostromo with hints of dissent in Costaguana", his fictional South American country.  He plotted a revolution in the Costaguanan fictional port of Sulaco that mirrored the real-life secessionist movement brewing in Panama.  When Conrad finished the novel on 1 September 1904, writes Jasanoff, "he left Sulaco in the condition of Panama.  As Panama had gotten its independence instantly recognized by the United States and its economy bolstered by American investment in the canal, so Sulaco had its independence instantly recognized by the United States, and its economy underwritten by investment in the [fictional] San Tomé [silver] mine."

The Secret Agent (completed 1906) was inspired by the French anarchist Martial Bourdin's 1894 death while apparently attempting to blow up the Greenwich Observatory. Conrad's story "The Secret Sharer" (completed 1909) was inspired by an 1880 incident when Sydney Smith, first mate of the Cutty Sark, had killed a seaman and fled from justice, aided by the ship's captain. The plot of Under Western Eyes (completed 1910) is kicked off by the assassination of a brutal Russian government minister, modelled after the real-life 1904 assassination of Russian Minister of the Interior Vyacheslav von Plehve. The near-novella "Freya of the Seven Isles" (completed in March 1911) was inspired by a story told to Conrad by a Malaya old hand and fan of Conrad's, Captain Carlos M. Marris.

For the natural surroundings of the high seas, the Malay Archipelago and South America, which Conrad described so vividly, he could rely on his own observations. What his brief landfalls could not provide was a thorough understanding of exotic cultures. For this he resorted, like other writers, to literary sources. When writing his Malayan stories, he consulted Alfred Russel Wallace's The Malay Archipelago (1869), James Brooke's journals, and books with titles like Perak and the Malays, My Journal in Malayan Waters, and Life in the Forests of the Far East. When he set about writing his novel Nostromo, set in the fictional South American country of Costaguana, he turned to The War between Peru and Chile; Edward Eastwick, Venezuela: or, Sketches of Life in a South American Republic (1868); and George Frederick Masterman, Seven Eventful Years in Paraguay (1869).  As a result of relying on literary sources, in Lord Jim, as J. I. M. Stewart writes, Conrad's "need to work to some extent from second-hand" led to "a certain thinness in Jim's relations with the... peoples... of Patusan..." This prompted Conrad at some points to alter the nature of Charles Marlow's narrative to "distanc[e] an uncertain command of the detail of Tuan Jim's empire."

In keeping with his scepticism and melancholy, Conrad almost invariably gives lethal fates to the characters in his principal novels and stories. Almayer (Almayer's Folly, 1894), abandoned by his beloved daughter, takes to opium, and dies. Peter Willems (An Outcast of the Islands, 1895) is killed by his jealous lover Aïssa. The ineffectual "Nigger", James Wait (The Nigger of the 'Narcissus', 1897), dies aboard ship and is buried at sea. Mr. Kurtz (Heart of Darkness, 1899) expires, uttering the words, "The horror!  The horror!" Tuan Jim (Lord Jim, 1900), having inadvertently precipitated a massacre of his adoptive community, deliberately walks to his death at the hands of the community's leader. In Conrad's 1901 short story, "Amy Foster", a Pole transplanted to England, Yanko Goorall (an English transliteration of the Polish Janko Góral, "Johnny Highlander"), falls ill and, suffering from a fever, raves in his native language, frightening his wife Amy, who flees; next morning Yanko dies of heart failure, and it transpires that he had simply been asking in Polish for water. Captain Whalley (The End of the Tether, 1902), betrayed by failing eyesight and an unscrupulous partner, drowns himself. Gian' Battista Fidanza, the eponymous respected Italian-immigrant Nostromo of the novel Nostromo (1904), illicitly obtains a treasure of silver mined in the South American country of "Costaguana" and is shot dead due to mistaken identity. Mr. Verloc, The Secret Agent (1906) of divided loyalties, attempts a bombing, to be blamed on terrorists, that accidentally kills his mentally defective brother-in-law Stevie, and Verloc himself is killed by his distraught wife, who drowns herself by jumping overboard from a channel steamer. In Chance (1913), Roderick Anthony, a sailing-ship captain, and benefactor and husband of Flora de Barral, becomes the target of a poisoning attempt by her jealous disgraced financier father who, when detected, swallows the poison himself and dies (some years later, Captain Anthony drowns at sea). In Victory (1915), Lena is shot dead by Jones, who had meant to kill his accomplice Ricardo and later succeeds in doing so, then himself perishes along with another accomplice, after which Lena's protector Axel Heyst sets fire to his bungalow and dies beside Lena's body.

When a principal character of Conrad's does escape with his life, he sometimes does not fare much better. In Under Western Eyes (1911), Razumov betrays a fellow University of St. Petersburg student, the revolutionist Victor Haldin, who has assassinated a savagely repressive Russian government minister. Haldin is tortured and hanged by the authorities. Later Razumov, sent as a government spy to Geneva, a centre of anti-tsarist intrigue, meets the mother and sister of Haldin, who share Haldin's liberal convictions. Razumov falls in love with the sister and confesses his betrayal of her brother; later, he makes the same avowal to assembled revolutionists, and their professional executioner bursts his eardrums, making him deaf for life. Razumov staggers away, is knocked down by a streetcar, and finally returns as a cripple to Russia.

Conrad was keenly conscious of tragedy in the world and in his works. In 1898, at the start of his writing career, he had written to his Scottish writer-politician friend Cunninghame Graham: "What makes mankind tragic is not that they are the victims of nature, it is that they are conscious of it. [A]s soon as you know of your slavery the pain, the anger, the strife—the tragedy begins."  But in 1922, near the end of his life and career, when another Scottish friend, Richard Curle, sent Conrad proofs of two articles he had written about Conrad, the latter objected to being characterised as a gloomy and tragic writer. "That reputation... has deprived me of innumerable readers... I absolutely object to being called a tragedian."

Conrad claimed that he "never kept a diary and never owned a notebook." John Galsworthy, who knew him well, described this as "a statement which surprised no one who knew the resources of his memory and the brooding nature of his creative spirit." Nevertheless, after Conrad's death, Richard Curle published a heavily modified version of Conrad's diaries describing his experiences in the Congo; in 1978 a more complete version was published as  The Congo Diary and Other Uncollected Pieces. The first accurate transcription was published in Robert Hampson's Penguin edition of Heart of Darkness in 1995; Hampson's transcription and annotations were reprinted in the Penguin edition of 2007.

Unlike many authors who make it a point not to discuss work in progress, Conrad often did discuss his current work and even showed it to select friends and fellow authors, such as Edward Garnett, and sometimes modified it in the light of their critiques and suggestions.

Edward Said was struck by the sheer quantity of Conrad's correspondence with friends and fellow writers; by 1966, it "amount[ed] to eight published volumes". Said comments:  "[I]t seemed to me that if Conrad wrote of himself, of the problem of self-definition, with such sustained urgency, some of what he wrote must have had meaning for his fiction.  [I]t [was] difficult to believe that a man would be so uneconomical as to pour himself out in letter after letter and then not use and reformulate his insights and discoveries in his fiction." Said found especially close parallels between Conrad's letters and his shorter fiction.  "Conrad... believed... that artistic distinction was more tellingly demonstrated in a shorter rather than a longer work....  He believed that his [own] life was like a series of short episodes... because he was himself so many different people...:  he was a Pole and an Englishman, a sailor and a writer." Another scholar, Najder, writes:

Conrad borrowed from other, Polish- and French-language authors, to an extent sometimes skirting plagiarism. When the Polish translation of his 1915 novel Victory appeared in 1931, readers noted striking similarities to Stefan Żeromski's kitschy novel, The History of a Sin (Dzieje grzechu, 1908), including their endings. Comparative-literature scholar Yves Hervouet has demonstrated in the text of Victory a whole mosaic of influences, borrowings, similarities and allusions. He further lists hundreds of concrete borrowings from other, mostly French authors in nearly all of Conrad's works, from Almayer's Folly (1895) to his unfinished Suspense. Conrad seems to have used eminent writers' texts as raw material of the same kind as the content of his own memory. Materials borrowed from other authors often functioned as allusions. Moreover, he had a phenomenal memory for texts and remembered details, "but [writes Najder] it was not a memory strictly categorized according to sources, marshalled into homogeneous entities; it was, rather, an enormous receptacle of images and pieces from which he would draw."

Continues Najder: "[H]e can never be accused of outright plagiarism. Even when lifting sentences and scenes, Conrad changed their character, inserted them within novel structures. He did not imitate, but (as Hervouet says) 'continued' his masters. He was right in saying:  'I don't resemble anybody.' Ian Watt put it succinctly:  'In a sense, Conrad is the least derivative of writers; he wrote very little that could possibly be mistaken for the work of anyone else.' Conrad's acquaintance George Bernard Shaw says it well: "[A] man can no more be completely original [...] than a tree can grow out of air."

Conrad, like other artists, faced constraints arising from the need to propitiate his audience and confirm their own favourable self-regard. Similarly, in his letters Conrad—during most of his literary career, struggling for sheer financial survival—often adjusted his views to the predilections of his correspondents.
Historians have also noted that Conrad's works which were set in European colonies and intended to critique the effects of colonialism were set in Dutch and Belgian colonies, instead of the British Empire.

The singularity of the universe depicted in Conrad's novels, especially compared to those of near-contemporaries like his friend and frequent benefactor John Galsworthy, is such as to open him to criticism similar to that later applied to Graham Greene. But where "Greeneland" has been characterised as a recurring and recognisable atmosphere independent of setting, Conrad is at pains to create a sense of place, be it aboard ship or in a remote village; often he chose to have his characters play out their destinies in isolated or confined circumstances. In the view of Evelyn Waugh and Kingsley Amis, it was not until the first volumes of Anthony Powell's sequence, A Dance to the Music of Time, were published in the 1950s, that an English novelist achieved the same command of atmosphere and precision of language with consistency, a view supported by later critics like A. N. Wilson; Powell acknowledged his debt to Conrad. Leo Gurko, too, remarks, as "one of Conrad's special qualities, his abnormal awareness of place, an awareness magnified to almost a new dimension in art, an ecological dimension defining the relationship between earth and man."

T. E. Lawrence, one of many writers whom Conrad befriended, offered some perceptive observations about Conrad's writing:

The Irish novelist-poet-critic Colm Tóibín captures something similar:

In a letter of 14 December 1897 to his Scottish friend, Robert Bontine Cunninghame Graham, Conrad wrote that science tells us, "Understand that thou art nothing, less than a shadow, more insignificant than a drop of water in the ocean, more fleeting than the illusion of a dream."

In a letter of 20 December 1897 to Cunninghame Graham, Conrad metaphorically described the universe as a huge machine:

Conrad wrote Cunninghame Graham on 31 January 1898:

Leo Robson suggests that

According to Robson,

Language

Conrad spoke his native Polish and the French language fluently from childhood and only acquired English in his twenties. He would probably have spoken some Ukrainian as a child; he certainly had to have some knowledge of German and Russian. His son Borys records that, though Conrad had insisted that he spoke only a few words of German, when they reached the Austrian frontier in the family's attempt to leave Poland in 1914, Conrad spoke German "at considerable length and extreme fluency". Russia, Prussia, and Austria had divided up Poland among them, and he was officially a Russian subject until his naturalization as a British subject. As a result, up to this point, his official documents were in Russian. His knowledge of Russian was good enough that his uncle Tadeusz Bobrowski wrote him (22 May 1893) advising that, when Conrad came to visit, he should "telegraph for horses, but in Russian, for Oratów doesn't receive or accept messages in an 'alien' language."

Conrad chose, however, to write his fiction in English.  He says in his preface to A Personal Record that writing in English was for him "natural", and that the idea of his having made a deliberate choice between English and French, as some had suggested, was in error. He explained that, though he had been familiar with French from childhood, "I would have been afraid to attempt expression in a language so perfectly 'crystallized'." In 1915, as Jo Davidson sculpted his bust, Conrad answered his question: "Ah… to write French you have to know it. English is so plastic—if you haven't got a word you need you can make it, but to write French you have to be an artist like Anatole France." These statements, as so often in Conrad's "autobiographical" writings, are subtly disingenuous. In 1897 Conrad was visited by a fellow Pole, the philosopher Wincenty Lutosławski, who asked Conrad, "Why don't you write in Polish?" Lutosławski recalled Conrad explaining: "I value our beautiful Polish literature too much to bring into it my clumsy efforts. But for the English my gifts are sufficient and secure my daily bread."

Conrad wrote in A Personal Record that English was "the speech of my secret choice, of my future, of long friendships, of the deepest affections, of hours of toil and hours of ease, and of solitary hours, too, of books read, of thoughts pursued, of remembered emotions—of my very dreams!" In 1878 Conrad's four-year experience in the French merchant marine had been cut short when the French discovered he did not have a permit from the Imperial Russian consul to sail with the French. This, and some typically disastrous Conradian investments, had left him destitute and had precipitated a suicide attempt. With the concurrence of his mentor-uncle Tadeusz Bobrowski, who had been summoned to Marseilles, Conrad decided to seek employment with the British merchant marine, which did not require Russia's permission. Thus began Conrad's sixteen years' seafarer's acquaintance with the British and with the English language.

Had Conrad remained in the Francophone sphere or had he returned to Poland, the son of the Polish poet, playwright, and translator Apollo Korzeniowski—from childhood exposed to Polish and foreign literature, and ambitious to himself become a writer—he might have ended up writing in French or Polish instead of English. Certainly his Uncle Tadeusz thought Conrad might write in Polish; in an 1881 letter he advised his 23-year-old nephew:

In the opinion of some biographers, Conrad's third language, English, remained under the influence of his first two languages—Polish and French. This makes his English seem unusual. Najder writes that:

Inevitably for a trilingual Polish–French–English-speaker, Conrad's writings occasionally show linguistic spillover:  "Franglais" or "Poglish"—the inadvertent use of French or Polish vocabulary, grammar, or syntax in his English writings. In one instance, Najder uses "several slips in vocabulary, typical for Conrad (Gallicisms) and grammar (usually Polonisms)" as part of internal evidence against Conrad's sometime literary collaborator Ford Madox Ford's claim to have written a certain instalment of Conrad's novel Nostromo, for publication in T. P.'s Weekly, on behalf of an ill Conrad.

The impracticality of working with a language which has long ceased to be one's principal language of daily use is illustrated by Conrad's 1921 attempt at translating into English the Polish physicist, columnist, story-writer, and comedy-writer Bruno Winawer's short play, The Book of Job. Najder writes:

As a practical matter, by the time Conrad set about writing fiction, he had little choice but to write in English. Poles who accused Conrad of cultural apostasy because he wrote in English instead of Polish missed the point—as do Anglophones who see, in Conrad's default choice of English as his artistic medium, a testimonial to some sort of innate superiority of the English language.

According to Conrad's close friend and literary assistant Richard Curle, the fact of Conrad writing in English was "obviously misleading" because Conrad "is no more completely English in his art than he is in his nationality".  Conrad, according to Curle, "could never have written in any other language save the English language....for he would have been dumb in any other language but the English."

Conrad always retained a strong emotional attachment to his native language. He asked his visiting Polish niece Karola Zagórska, "Will you forgive me that my sons don't speak Polish?" In June 1924, shortly before his death, he apparently expressed a desire that his son John marry a Polish girl and learn Polish, and toyed with the idea of returning for good to now independent Poland.

Conrad bridled at being referred to as a Russian or "Slavonic" writer.  The only Russian writer he admired was Ivan Turgenev. "The critics", he wrote an acquaintance on 31 January 1924, six months before his death, "detected in me a new note and as, just when I began to write, they had discovered the existence of Russian authors, they stuck that label on me under the name of Slavonism.  What I venture to say is that it would have been more just to charge me at most with Polonism." However, though Conrad protested that Dostoyevsky was "too Russian for me" and that Russian literature generally was "repugnant to me hereditarily and individually", Under Western Eyes is viewed as Conrad's response to the themes explored in Dostoyevsky's Crime and Punishment.

Conrad had an awareness that, in any language, individual expressions – words, phrases, sentences – are fraught with connotations. He once wrote: "No English word has clean edges." All expressions, he thought, carried so many connotations as to be little more than "instruments for exciting blurred emotions." This might help elucidate the impressionistic quality of many passages in his writings. It also explains why he chose to write his literary works not in Polish or French but in English, with which for decades he had had the greatest contact.

Controversy
In 1975 the Nigerian writer Chinua Achebe published an essay, "An Image of Africa: Racism in Conrad's 'Heart of Darkness'", which provoked controversy by calling Conrad a "thoroughgoing racist". Achebe's view was that Heart of Darkness cannot be considered a great work of art because it is "a novel which celebrates... dehumanisation, which depersonalises a portion of the human race." Referring to Conrad as a "talented, tormented man", Achebe notes that Conrad (via the protagonist, Charles Marlow) reduces and degrades Africans to "limbs", "ankles", "glistening white eyeballs", etc., while simultaneously (and fearfully) suspecting a common kinship between himself and these natives—leading Marlow to sneer the word "ugly." Achebe also cited Conrad's description of an encounter with an African: "A certain enormous buck nigger encountered in Haiti fixed my conception of blind, furious, unreasoning rage, as manifested in the human animal to the end of my days." Achebe's essay, a landmark in postcolonial discourse, provoked debate, and the questions it raised have been addressed in most subsequent literary criticism of Conrad.

Achebe's critics argue that he fails to distinguish Marlow's view from Conrad's, which results in very clumsy interpretations of the novella. In their view, Conrad portrays Africans sympathetically and their plight tragically, and refers sarcastically to, and condemns outright, the supposedly noble aims of European colonists, thereby demonstrating his skepticism about the moral superiority of white men. Ending a passage that describes the condition of chained, emaciated slaves, the novelist remarks: "After all, I also was a part of the great cause of these high and just proceedings." Some observers assert that Conrad, whose native country had been conquered by imperial powers, empathised by default with other subjugated peoples. Jeffrey Meyers notes that Conrad, like his acquaintance Roger Casement, "was one of the first men to question the Western notion of progress, a dominant idea in Europe from the Renaissance to the Great War, to attack the hypocritical justification of colonialism and to reveal... the savage degradation of the white man in Africa." Likewise, E.D. Morel, who led international opposition to King Leopold II's rule in the Congo, saw Conrad's Heart of Darkness as a condemnation of colonial brutality and referred to the novella as "the most powerful thing written on the subject." More recently, Nidesh Lawtoo complicated the race debate by showing that Conrad's images of "frenzy" depict rituals of "possession trance" that are equally central to Achebe's Things Fall Apart.

Conrad scholar Peter Firchow writes that "nowhere in the novel does Conrad or any of his narrators, personified or otherwise, claim superiority on the part of Europeans on the grounds of alleged genetic or biological difference." If Conrad or his novel is racist, it is only in a weak sense, since Heart of Darkness acknowledges racial distinctions "but does not suggest an essential superiority" of any group. Achebe's reading of Heart of Darkness can be (and has been) challenged by a reading of Conrad's other African story, "An Outpost of Progress", which has an omniscient narrator, rather than the embodied narrator, Marlow. Some younger scholars, such as Masood Ashraf Raja, have also suggested that if we read Conrad beyond Heart of Darkness, especially his Malay novels, racism can be further complicated by foregrounding Conrad's positive representation of Muslims.

In 1998 H.S. Zins wrote in Pula: Botswana Journal of African Studies:

Adam Hochschild makes a similar point:

Conrad's experience in the Belgian-run Congo made him one of the fiercest critics of the "white man's mission."  It was also, writes Najder, Conrad's most daring and last "attempt to become a homo socialis, a cog in the mechanism of society. By accepting the job in the trading company, he joined, for once in his life, an organized, large-scale group activity on land....  It is not accidental that the Congo expedition remained an isolated event in Conrad's life. Until his death he remained a recluse in the social sense and never became involved with any institution or clearly defined group of people."

Citizenship
Conrad was a Russian subject, having been born in the Russian part of what had once been the Polish–Lithuanian Commonwealth. After his father's death, Conrad's uncle Bobrowski had attempted to secure Austrian citizenship for him—to no avail, probably because Conrad had not received permission from Russian authorities to remain abroad permanently and had not been released from being a Russian subject. Conrad could not return to Ukraine, in the Russian Empire—he would have been liable to many years' military service and, as the son of political exiles, to harassment.

In a letter of 9 August 1877, Conrad's uncle Bobrowski broached two important subjects: the desirability of Conrad's naturalisation abroad (tantamount to release from being a Russian subject) and Conrad's plans to join the British merchant marine. "[D]o you speak English?... I never wished you to become naturalized in France, mainly because of the compulsory military service... I thought, however, of your getting naturalized in Switzerland..."  In his next letter, Bobrowski supported Conrad's idea of seeking citizenship of the United States or of "one of the more important Southern [American] Republics".

Eventually Conrad would make his home in England. On 2 July 1886 he applied for British nationality, which was granted on 19 August 1886. Yet, in spite of having become a subject of Queen Victoria, Conrad had not ceased to be a subject of Tsar Alexander III. To achieve his freedom from that subjection, he had to make many visits to the Russian Embassy in London and politely reiterate his request. He would later recall the Embassy's home at Belgrave Square in his novel The Secret Agent. Finally, on 2 April 1889, the Russian Ministry of Home Affairs released "the son of a Polish man of letters, captain of the British merchant marine" from the status of Russian subject.

Memorials

An anchor-shaped monument to Conrad at Gdynia, on Poland's Baltic Seacoast, features a quotation from him in Polish: "Nic tak nie nęci, nie rozczarowuje i nie zniewala, jak życie na morzu" ("[T]here is nothing more enticing, disenchanting, and enslaving than the life at sea" – Lord Jim, chapter 2, paragraph 1).

In Circular Quay, Sydney, Australia, a plaque in a "writers walk" commemorates Conrad's visits to Australia between 1879 and 1892. The plaque notes that "Many of his works reflect his 'affection for that young continent.'"

In San Francisco in 1979, a small triangular square at Columbus Avenue and Beach Street, near Fisherman's Wharf, was dedicated as "Joseph Conrad Square" after Conrad. The square's dedication was timed to coincide with release of Francis Ford Coppola's Heart of Darkness-inspired film, Apocalypse Now. Conrad does not appear to have ever visited San Francisco.

In the latter part of World War II, the Royal Navy cruiser HMS Danae was rechristened ORP Conrad and served as part of the Polish Navy.

Notwithstanding the undoubted sufferings that Conrad endured on many of his voyages, sentimentality and canny marketing place him at the best lodgings in several of his destinations. Hotels across the Far East still lay claim to him as an honoured guest, with, however, no evidence to back their claims: Singapore's Raffles Hotel continues to claim he stayed there though he lodged, in fact, at the Sailors' Home nearby. His visit to Bangkok also remains in that city's collective memory, and is recorded in the official history of The Oriental Hotel (where he never, in fact, stayed, lodging aboard his ship, the Otago) along with that of a less well-behaved guest, Somerset Maugham, who pilloried the hotel in a short story in revenge for attempts to eject him.

A plaque commemorating "Joseph Conrad–Korzeniowski" has been installed near Singapore's Fullerton Hotel.

Conrad is also reported to have stayed at Hong Kong's Peninsula Hotel—at a port that, in fact, he never visited. Later literary admirers, notably Graham Greene, followed closely in his footsteps, sometimes requesting the same room and perpetuating myths that have no basis in fact. No Caribbean resort is yet known to have claimed Conrad's patronage, although he is believed to have stayed at a Fort-de-France pension upon arrival in Martinique on his first voyage, in 1875, when he travelled as a passenger on the Mont Blanc.

In April 2013, a monument to Conrad was unveiled in the Russian town of Vologda, where he and his parents lived in exile in 1862–63. The monument was removed, with unclear explanation, in June 2016.

Legacy
After the publication of Chance in 1913, Conrad was the subject of more discussion and praise than any other English writer of the time. He had a genius for companionship, and his circle of friends, which he had begun assembling even prior to his first publications, included authors and other leading lights in the arts, such as Henry James, Robert Bontine Cunninghame Graham, John Galsworthy, Galsworthy's wife Ada Galsworthy (translator of French literature), Edward Garnett, Garnett's wife Constance Garnett (translator of Russian literature), Stephen Crane, Hugh Walpole, George Bernard Shaw, H. G. Wells (whom Conrad dubbed "the historian of the ages to come"), Arnold Bennett, Norman Douglas, Jacob Epstein, T. E. Lawrence, André Gide, Paul Valéry, Maurice Ravel, Valery Larbaud, Saint-John Perse, Edith Wharton, James Huneker, anthropologist Bronisław Malinowski, Józef Retinger (later a founder of the European Movement, which led to the European Union, and author of Conrad and His Contemporaries). In the early 1900s Conrad composed a short series of novels in collaboration with Ford Madox Ford.

In 1919 and 1922 Conrad's growing renown and prestige among writers and critics in continental Europe fostered his hopes for a Nobel Prize in Literature. It was apparently the French and Swedes—not the English—who favoured Conrad's candidacy. 

In April 1924 Conrad, who possessed a hereditary Polish status of nobility and coat-of-arms (Nałęcz), declined a (non-hereditary) British knighthood offered by Labour Party Prime Minister Ramsay MacDonald.   Conrad kept a distance from official structures—he never voted in British national elections—and seems to have been averse to public honours generally; he had already refused honorary degrees from Cambridge, Durham, Edinburgh, Liverpool, and Yale universities.

In the Polish People's Republic, translations of Conrad's works were openly published, except for Under Western Eyes, which in the 1980s was published as an underground "bibuła".

Conrad's narrative style and anti-heroic characters have influenced many authors, including T. S. Eliot, Maria Dąbrowska, F. Scott Fitzgerald, William Faulkner, Gerald Basil Edwards, Ernest Hemingway, Antoine de Saint-Exupéry, André Malraux, George Orwell, Graham Greene, William Golding, William Burroughs, Saul Bellow, Gabriel García Márquez, Peter Matthiessen, John le Carré, V. S. Naipaul, Philip Roth, Joan Didion, Thomas Pynchon J. M. Coetzee, and Salman Rushdie. Many films have been adapted from, or inspired by, Conrad's works.

Impressions
A striking portrait of Conrad, aged about 46, was drawn by the historian and poet Henry Newbolt, who met him about 1903:

On 12 October 1912, American music critic James Huneker visited Conrad and later recalled being received by "a man of the world, neither sailor nor novelist, just a simple-mannered gentleman, whose welcome was sincere, whose glance was veiled, at times far-away, whose ways were French, Polish, anything but 'literary,' bluff or English."

After respective separate visits to Conrad in August and September 1913, two British aristocrats, the socialite Lady Ottoline Morrell and the mathematician and philosopher Bertrand Russell—who were lovers at the time—recorded their impressions of the novelist. In her diary, Morrell wrote:

A month later, Bertrand Russell visited Conrad at Capel House in Orlestone, and the same day on the train wrote down his impressions:

Russell's Autobiography, published over half a century later in 1968, confirms his original experience:

It was not only Anglophones who remarked Conrad's strong foreign accent when speaking English.  After French poet Paul Valéry and French composer Maurice Ravel made Conrad's acquaintance in December 1922, Valéry wrote in 1924 of having been astonished at Conrad's "horrible" accent in English.

The subsequent friendship and correspondence between Conrad and Russell lasted, with long intervals, to the end of Conrad's life. In one letter, Conrad avowed his "deep admiring affection, which, if you were never to see me again and forget my existence tomorrow will be unalterably yours usque ad finem." Conrad in his correspondence often used the Latin expression meaning "to the very end", which he seems to have adopted from his faithful guardian, mentor and benefactor, his maternal uncle Tadeusz Bobrowski. 

Conrad looked with less optimism than Russell on the possibilities of scientific and philosophic knowledge.  In a 1913 letter to acquaintances who had invited Conrad to join their society, he reiterated his belief that it was impossible to understand the essence of either reality or life: both science and art penetrate no further than the outer shapes.

Najder describes Conrad as "[a]n alienated émigré... haunted by a sense of the unreality of other people – a feeling natural to someone living outside the established structures of family, social milieu, and country".

Conrad's sense of loneliness throughout his life in exile found memorable expression in the 1901 short story "Amy Foster".

Works

NovelsAlmayer's Folly (1895)An Outcast of the Islands (1896)The Nigger of the 'Narcissus' (1897)Heart of Darkness (1899)Lord Jim (1900)The Inheritors (with Ford Madox Ford) (1901)Typhoon (1902, begun 1899)The End of the Tether (written in 1902; collected in Youth, a Narrative and Two Other Stories, 1902)Romance (with Ford Madox Ford, 1903)Nostromo (1904)The Secret Agent (1907)Under Western Eyes (1911)Chance (1913)Victory (1915)The Shadow Line (1917)The Arrow of Gold (1919)The Rescue (1920)The Nature of a Crime (1923, with Ford Madox Ford)The Rover (1923)Suspense (1925; unfinished, published posthumously)

Stories
 "The Black Mate":  written, according to Conrad, in 1886; may be counted as his opus double zero; published 1908; posthumously collected in Tales of Hearsay, 1925.
 "The Idiots":  Conrad's truly first short story, which may be counted as his opus zero, was written during his honeymoon (1896), published in The Savoy periodical, 1896, and collected in Tales of Unrest, 1898.
 "The Lagoon":  composed 1896; published in Cornhill Magazine, 1897; collected in Tales of Unrest, 1898: "It is the first short story I ever wrote."
 "An Outpost of Progress":  written 1896; published in Cosmopolis, 1897, and collected in Tales of Unrest, 1898: "My next [second] effort in short-story writing"; it shows numerous thematic affinities with Heart of Darkness; in 1906, Conrad described it as his "best story".
 "The Return":  completed early 1897, while writing "Karain"; never published in magazine form; collected in Tales of Unrest, 1898: "[A]ny kind word about 'The Return' (and there have been such words said at different times) awakens in me the liveliest gratitude, for I know how much the writing of that fantasy has cost me in sheer toil, in temper, and in disillusion."  Conrad, who suffered while writing this psychological chef-d'oeuvre of introspection, once remarked:  "I hate it."
 "Karain: A Memory":  written February–April 1897; published November 1897 in Blackwood's Magazine and collected in Tales of Unrest, 1898: "my third short story in... order of time".
 "Youth":  written 1898; collected in Youth, a Narrative, and Two Other Stories, 1902
 "Falk":  novella / story, written early 1901; collected only in Typhoon and Other Stories, 1903
 "Amy Foster":  composed 1901; published in the Illustrated London News, December 1901, and collected in Typhoon and Other Stories, 1903.
 "To-morrow":  written early 1902; serialised in The Pall Mall Magazine, 1902, and collected in Typhoon and Other Stories, 1903
 "Gaspar Ruiz":  written after Nostromo in 1904–5; published in The Strand Magazine, 1906, and collected in A Set of Six, 1908 (UK), 1915 (US). This story was the only piece of Conrad's fiction ever adapted by the author for cinema, as Gaspar the Strong Man, 1920.
 "An Anarchist":  written late 1905; serialised in Harper's Magazine, 1906; collected in A Set of Six, 1908 (UK), 1915 (US)
 "The Informer":  written before January 1906; published, December 1906, in Harper's Magazine, and collected in A Set of Six, 1908 (UK), 1915 (US)
 "The Brute":  written early 1906; published in The Daily Chronicle, December 1906; collected in A Set of Six, 1908 (UK), 1915 (US)
 "The Duel: A Military Story":  serialised in the UK in The Pall Mall Magazine, early 1908, and later that year in the US as "The Point of Honor", in the periodical Forum; collected in A Set of Six in 1908 and published by Garden City Publishing in 1924. Joseph Fouché makes a cameo appearance.
 "Il Conde" (i.e., "Conte" [The Count]):  appeared in Cassell's Magazine (UK), 1908, and Hamptons (US), 1909; collected in A Set of Six, 1908 (UK), 1915 (US)
 "The Secret Sharer":  written December 1909; published in Harper's Magazine, 1910, and collected in Twixt Land and Sea, 1912
 "Prince Roman": written 1910, published 1911 in The Oxford and Cambridge Review; posthumously collected in Tales of Hearsay, 1925; based on the story of Prince Roman Sanguszko of Poland (1800–81)
 "A Smile of Fortune": a long story, almost a novella, written in mid-1910; published in London Magazine, February 1911; collected in 'Twixt Land and Sea, 1912
 "Freya of the Seven Isles":  a near-novella, written late 1910–early 1911; published in The Metropolitan Magazine and London Magazine, early 1912 and July 1912, respectively; collected in 'Twixt Land and Sea, 1912
 "The Partner":  written 1911; published in Within the Tides, 1915
 "The Inn of the Two Witches": written 1913; published in Within the Tides, 1915
 "Because of the Dollars": written 1914; published in Within the Tides, 1915
 "The Planter of Malata": written 1914; published in Within the Tides, 1915
 "The Warrior's Soul": written late 1915–early 1916; published in Land and Water, March 1917; collected in Tales of Hearsay, 1925
 "The Tale": Conrad's only story about World War I; written 1916, first published 1917 in The Strand Magazine; posthumously collected in Tales of Hearsay, 1925

Essays
 "Autocracy and War" (1905)
 The Mirror of the Sea (collection of autobiographical essays first published in various magazines 1904–06), 1906
 A Personal Record (also published as Some Reminiscences), 1912
 The First News, 1918
 The Lesson of the Collision:  A monograph upon the loss of the "Empress of Ireland", 1919
 The Polish Question, 1919
 The Shock of War, 1919
 Notes on Life and Letters, 1921
 Notes on My Books, 1921
 Last Essays, edited by Richard Curle, 1926
 The Congo Diary and Other Uncollected Pieces, edited by Zdzisław Najder, 1978, 

Adaptations
A number of works in various genres and media have been based on, or inspired by, Conrad's writings, including:

Cinema
 Victory (1919), directed by Maurice Tourneur
 Gaspar the Strong Man (1920), adapted from Gaspar Ruiz by the author
 Lord Jim (1925), directed by Victor Fleming
 Niebezpieczny raj (Dangerous Paradise, 1930), a Polish adaptation of Victory Dangerous Paradise (1930), an adaptation of Victory directed by William Wellman
 Sabotage (1936), adapted from Conrad's The Secret Agent, directed by Alfred Hitchcock
 Victory (1940), featuring Fredric March
 An Outcast of the Islands (1952), directed by Carol Reed and featuring Trevor Howard
 Laughing Anne (1953), based on Conrad's Laughing Anne.
 Lord Jim (1965), directed by Richard Brooks and starring Peter O'Toole
 The Rover (1967), adaptation of the novel The Rover (1923), directed by Terence Young, featuring Anthony Quinn
 La ligne d'ombre (1973), a TV adaptation of The Shadow Line by Georges Franju
 Smuga cienia (The Shadow Line, 1976), a Polish-British adaptation of The Shadow Line, directed by Andrzej Wajda
 The Duellists (1977), an adaptation of The Duel by Ridley Scott
 Naufragio (1977), a Mexican adaptation of Tomorrow directed by Jaime Humberto Hermosillo
 Apocalypse Now (1979), by Francis Ford Coppola, adapted from Heart of Darkness Un reietto delle isole (1980), by Giorgio Moser, an Italian adaptation of An Outcast of the Islands, starring Maria Carta
 Victory (1995), adapted by director Mark Peploe from the novel
 The Secret Agent (1996), starring Bob Hoskins, Patricia Arquette and Gérard Depardieu
 Swept from the Sea (1997), an adaptation of Amy Foster directed by Beeban Kidron
 Gabrielle (2005) directed by Patrice Chéreau. Adaptation of the short story "The Return" (1898), starring Isabelle Huppert and Pascal Greggory.
 Hanyut (2011), a Malaysian adaptation of Almayer's Folly Almayer's Folly (2011), directed by Chantal Akerman
 Secret Sharer (2014), inspired by "The Secret Sharer", directed by Peter Fudakowski
 The Young One (2016), an adaptation of the short story "Youth", directed by Julien Samani
 An Outpost of Progress (2016), an adaptation of the short story "An Outpost of Progress", directed by Hugo Vieira da Silva

Television
 Heart of Darkness (1958), a CBS 90-minute loose adaption on the anthology show Playhouse 90, starring Roddy McDowall, Boris Karloff, and Eartha Kitt
 The Secret Agent (1992 TV series) and The Secret Agent (2016 TV series), BBC TV series adapted from the novel The Secret Agent Heart of Darkness (1993) a TNT feature-length adaptation, directed by Nicolas Roeg, starring John Malkovich and Tim Roth; also released on VHS and DVD
 Nostromo (1997), a BBC TV adaptation, co-produced with Italian and Spanish TV networks and WGBH Boston

OperasHeart of Darkness (2011), a chamber opera in one act by Tarik O'Regan, with an English-language libretto by artist Tom Phillips.

Orchestral works
 Suite from Heart of Darkness (2013) for orchestra and narrator by Tarik O'Regan, extrapolated from the 2011 opera of the same name.

Video gamesSpec Ops: The Line (2012) by Yager Development, inspired by Heart of Darkness.

See also
 Bolesław Prus
 King Leopold's Ghost Alice Sarah Kinkead
 List of Poles
 List of covers of Time magazine (1920s) – 7 April 1923
 ORP Conrad – a World War II Polish Navy cruiser named after Joseph Conrad.
 Politics in fiction
 Stefan Bobrowski, one of Conrad's maternal uncles; like Conrad's father, a "Red"-faction political leader.

Notes

References

Sources
 
 
 
 Firchow, Peter Edgerly, Envisioning Africa:  Racism and Imperialism in Conrad's Heart of Darkness, University Press of Kentucky, 2000.
 Gorra, Michael, "Corrections of Taste" (review of Terry Eagleton, Critical Revolutionaries: Five Critics Who Changed the Way We Read, Yale University Press, 323 pp.), The New York Review of Books, vol. LXIX, no. 15 (October 6, 2022), pp. 16–18.
 
 
 
 
 
 
 
 
 Pei, Mario, The Story of Language, with an Introduction by Stuart Berg Flexner, revised ed., New York, New American Library, 1984, .
 
 Edward W. Said, Joseph Conrad and the Fiction of Autobiography, 2008 ed., New York, Columbia University Press, .
 
  
 
Taborski, Roman (1969), "Korzeniowski, Apollo", Polski słownik biograficzny, vol. XIV, Wrocław, Polska Akademia Nauk, pp. 167–69. 
 
 

Further reading

 Gérard Jean-Aubry, Vie de Conrad (Life of Conrad – the authorised biography), Gallimard, 1947, translated by Helen Sebba as The Sea Dreamer: A Definitive Biography of Joseph Conrad, New York, Doubleday & Co., 1957. 
 Anna Gąsienica Byrcyn, review of G. W. Stephen Brodsky, Joseph Conrad's Polish Soul:  Realms of Memory and Self, edited with an introduction by George Z. Gasyna (Conrad:  Eastern and Western Perspectives Series, vol. 25, edited by Wiesław Krajka), Lublin, Maria Curie-Skłodowska University Press, 2016, in The Polish Review, vol. 63, no. 4, 2018, pp. 103–5.  "Brodsky reflects on the significance of Conrad's Polish mind and spirit that imbued his writings yet are often overlooked and hardly acknowledged by Western scholars.... [T]he author... belong[ed] to the ethnic Polish minority and gentry class in a borderland society [in Ukraine], making him an exile from his birth."  (p. 104)
 Robert Hampson, Conrad's Secrets, Palgrave, 2012.
 Robert Hampson, Joseph Conrad, Reaktion Books, 2020.
 Maya Jasanoff, The Dawn Watch:  Joseph Conrad in a Global World, Penguin, 2017.
 Alex Kurczaba, ed., Conrad and Poland, Boulder, East European Monographs, 1996, .
 C. McCarthy, The Cambridge Introduction to Edward Said, Cambridge University Press, 2010.
 Joseph Retinger, Conrad and His Contemporaries, London: Minerva, 1941; New York: Roy, 1942.
 T. Scovel, A Time to Speak:  a Psycholinguistic Inquiry into the Critical Period for Human Speech, Cambridge, Massachusetts, Newbury House, 1988.
 Krystyna Tokarzówna, Stanisław Fita (Zygmunt Szweykowski, ed.), Bolesław Prus, 1847–1912: Kalendarz życia i twórczości (Bolesław Prus, 1847–1912: a Calendar of His Life and Work), Warsaw, Państwowy Instytut Wydawniczy, 1969.
 Ian Watt (2000) Essays on Conrad. Cambridge University Press. , 
 Olivier Weber, Conrad, Arthaud-Flammarion, 2011.
 Wise, T.J. (1920) A Bibliography of the Writings of Joseph Conrad (1895–1920). London: Printed for Private Circulation Only By Richard Clay & Sons, Ltd.
 Morton Dauwen Zabel, "Conrad, Joseph", Encyclopedia Americana, 1986 ed., vol. 7, pp. 606–07.

External links

Sources
 
 
 
 
 
 Works by Joseph Conrad at Conrad First, an archive of every newspaper and magazine in which the work of Joseph Conrad was first published.
 Works by Joseph Conrad at The Online Books Page
 Josep Conrad reviewed by H.L. Mencken: The Smart Set, July, 1921

Portals and biographies
 The Joseph Conrad Society (UK)
 Joseph Conrad Society of America
 Biography of Joseph Conrad, at The Joseph Conrad Centre of Poland
 Biography of Joseph Conrad, at The Literature NetworkLiterary criticism
 Conrad's page at Literary Journal.com, a number of research articles on Conrad's work
 Chinua Achebe: The Lecture Heard Around The World
 Edward Said, "Between Worlds:  Edward Said makes sense of his life", London Review of Books'', vol. 20, no. 9, 7 May 1998, pp. 3–7.

Miscellanea
 
 Archival material at 
 

 
1857 births
1924 deaths
19th-century British novelists
19th-century British short story writers
19th-century Polish nobility
19th-century Polish novelists
20th-century English novelists
20th-century Polish nobility
20th-century Polish novelists
British essayists
British Merchant Navy officers
British Merchant Navy personnel
British people of Polish descent
British psychological fiction writers
British short story writers
British travel writers
Burials in Kent
Clan of Nałęcz
Emigrants from the Russian Empire to the United Kingdom
Exophonic writers
Male essayists
Maritime writers
Modernist writers
Naturalised citizens of the United Kingdom
PEN International
People from Berdichevsky Uyezd
People from Berdychiv
People from Stanford-le-Hope
People from the Borough of Ashford
People from the City of Canterbury
People from the Russian Empire of Polish descent
People of the Victorian era
Philosophical pessimists
Polish essayists
Polish male novelists
Polish male short story writers
Polish political writers
Polish short story writers
Polish travel writers
Polish writers in English
Victorian novelists